Gazanfar Gulam oglu Akbarov (4 April 1917  3 August 1944) was an Azerbaijani Red Army senior sergeant and a posthumous Hero of the Soviet Union. Akbarov was awarded the title on 26 October 1944 for his actions in the Lublin–Brest Offensive. Akbarov was reported to have destroyed two tanks with his anti-tank gun and continued to fight while wounded. He was killed in the action.

Early life 
Akbarov was born on 4 April 1917 in Cəhri to a peasant family. In the spring of 1941, he graduated from the Nakhchivan Teacher Institute. He then worked as director of the Qoşadizə Junior High School.

World War II 
Akbarov was drafted into the Red Army in June 1941. He graduated from the regimental school and fought in combat from August. Akbarov fought in the Battle of the Caucasus. For his actions, he was awarded the Order of the Red Star on 11 July 1944 and the Medal "For Courage" on 13 January 1944. In 1944, he became a Communist Party of the Soviet Union member. Akbarov became a senior sergeant and anti-tank gun commander of the 1959th Anti-Tank Artillery Regiment, part of the 2nd Tank Army's 41st Anti-Tank Artillery Brigade.

Akbarov fought in the Lublin–Brest Offensive. On 3 August near the village of Derevni Nadma, he was involved in an engagement with German tanks. With guns and anti-tank grenades, the crew reportedly destroyed four tanks and about 100 German soldiers. Akbarov reportedly destroyed two tanks and was wounded. He continued to fight and was killed in the engagement. Akbarov was buried in the village. On 26 October, he was awarded the title Hero of the Soviet Union and the Order of Lenin for his actions.

Legacy 
A boarding school and tobacco farm in Nakhchivan were named for Akbarov. There is a monument in Cəhri and a plaque at the house where he lived.

References 

1917 births
1944 deaths
Heroes of the Soviet Union
Recipients of the Order of Lenin
Recipients of the Medal "For Courage" (Russia)
Soviet military personnel killed in World War II
Soviet military personnel of World War II from Azerbaijan
People from Babek District
People from Erivan Governorate
Communist Party of the Soviet Union members
Azerbaijani communists
Burials in Poland